Saminek  is a village in the administrative district of Gmina Dąbrówno, within Ostróda County, Warmian-Masurian Voivodeship, in northern Poland.

During World War II the Germans operated a forced labour subcamp of the Nazi prison in Barczewo in the village.

References

Saminek